The Co-cathedral of Christ the King is a Catholic place of worship located in Krunska 23, in the city center of Belgrade, Serbia. It is the oldest extant Catholic church in the city south of the Sava and the Danube rivers, and was built between 1924 and 1988, the cathedral of the Archdiocese of Belgrade.

History 
The Co-Cathedral of Christ the King is the oldest catholic place of worship of Belgrade. Its construction was undertaken only in 1924: in fact, since 1914 the negotiations were taking place between the Holy See and the Serbian government for the construction of a church. The new temple, dedicated to St. Ladislaus, was solemnly consecrated by the Apostolic Nuncio Pellegrinetti December 7, 1924 and elevated to the rank of cathedral of the newly Archdiocese of Belgrade, which was the first Archbishop Ivan Rafael Rodić. In 1926, the church was expanded and reached its current size, was also dedicated to Christ the King next year, were installed the new pipe organ and bells. Between 1966 and 1971, a period in which Ciril Zajec was cathedral’s vicar, were expanded local parish and the presbytery was converted to the new liturgical norms dictated by the Second Vatican Council. Since 1988, when he was consecrated the new cathedral dedicated to the Assumption of Mary, the Church of Christ the King has assumed the title of co-cathedral and is mainly used for diplomatic meetings, requiem Masses and interreligious meetings.

Description

Exterior 
The church is preceded by a small churchyard surrounded by a wrought iron gate onto which both the church and the rectory. The façade of the church of Christ the King is divided into two sections by a horizontal cornice in stucco: the lower is the portal, supported by two Corinthian columns and topped by a lunette mosaic depicting Christ Blessing; in the upper one, there are the window with round arch and cornice supported by two shelves decorated with a pattern hanging arches. To the left of the facade of the church, there is a bell tower with a belfry with three mullioned windows that opens to the outside. To the right of the church, however, is the rectory, on two floors, with four rectangular windows on the facade.

Interior 
The interior of the Co-cathedral of Christ the King has three naves covered with a barrel vault. Along them, above the band in white Carrara marble, are wooden Stations of the Cross and stained-glass windows with scenes from the life of Jesus and Mary. At the bottom of two side aisles is the transept, which ends with two semicircular apses protruding slightly. In it are altars dedicated to St. Joseph (right altar) and Our Lady of Lourdes (left altar), also used for the custody of the Blessed Sacrament. The presbytery has fully restored to its present post-conciliar 1960s, led by the architect Augustus Ranoki. Along the central axis, are the main altar and the marble bishop's throne. The apse is decorated with a modern mosaic depicting "Christ the King."

Pipe organ 
In the choir loft located on the central portal, is the pipe organ, built in 1927 by Frank Jenko. It has 14 stops placed on two keyboards and a pedalkeyboard.

External links

The church on the official website of the Archdiocese of Belgrade
The organ on the database of pipe organ from the web site organo.info

Roman Catholic churches in Belgrade
Roman Catholic cathedrals in Serbia
Vračar
20th-century Roman Catholic church buildings in Serbia